The Emergency Services (Obstruction) Act 2006 (c 39) is an Act of the Parliament of the United Kingdom. It is intended to reduce the instances of obstruction of, or assaults on, emergency service personnel.

Sections 1 to 6 came into force on 20 February 2007.

The corresponding Swedish law is called  (blåljussabotage for short, literally bluelight sabotage in English).

Scope

The Act defines emergency service personnel to cover firefighters, paramedics or other persons responding on behalf of the statutory ambulance service, members of HM Coastguard, and crew of a vessel of the RNLI or any other lifeboat.

Offences and penalties
The Act makes it an offence to obstruct any emergency service crew while responding to an emergency, whether physically or not, punishable by a fine of up to level 5 on the standard scale.

See R v McMenemy [2009] EWCA Crim 42, [2009] 2 Cr App R (S).

Section 6 - Repeals
This section repealed sections 44(3) and (4) of the Fire and Rescue Services Act 2004.

Section 7 - Short title, commencement and extent
This section came into force on 8 November 2006.

The Emergency Workers (Obstruction) Act 2006 (Commencement) Order 2007 (S.I. 2007/153 (C.7)) was made under section 7(2).

References
Halsbury's Statutes,
Ormerod (ed). Smith and Hogan's Criminal Law. 13th ed. OUP. 2011. p 673.

External links

United Kingdom Acts of Parliament 2006
Emergency services in the United Kingdom